Mount Vernon A.M.E. Church, also known as Mount Vernon African Methodist Episcopal Church, is a historic church located north of Gamaliel, Kentucky on Kentucky Route 100.  It was added to the National Register of Historic Places in 1977.

It is a one-room one-story log structure built with dovetail notching.  It was built by emancipated slaves in 1848.  It was the first black church in Monroe County, and it served as a school as well.

References

African Methodist Episcopal churches in Kentucky
Churches on the National Register of Historic Places in Kentucky
African-American history of Kentucky
National Register of Historic Places in Monroe County, Kentucky
Churches completed in 1848
1848 establishments in Kentucky
Log buildings and structures on the National Register of Historic Places in Kentucky